Condeau is a former commune in the Canton of Bretoncelles, in the Arrondissement of Mortagne-au-Perche, in the  department of Orne (and formerly within Le Perche region) in north-western France:  on 1 January 2016, it merged into the new commune of Sablons-sur-Huisne.

Origins and etymology

Condeau is a town that lies near the river Huisne in Lower Normandy.

The toponym "Condeau" is a diminutive of Condé, a neighboring town name as the confluence (Gaulish condate) of the Huisne and Corbionne rivers.

Demonym

The French demonym for people who live in Condeau is Condoléen.

History 

In 1789, after the Décret de la division de la France en départements  created townships, Condeau became chief town of its canton. In 1801, the canton was abolished.

On 1 January 2016, Condeau merged into Sablons-sur-Huisne as a municipality under by Law Number 2010-1563 of 16 December 2010 on local government reform.  The communes of Condeau, Condé-sur-Huisne, and Coulonges-les-Sablons merged and Condé-sur-Huisne became the chief town of the new municipality.

Administration

The town council comprises eleven members, including the mayor and two deputies.

Population 
In 2019, Condeau had 370 inhabitants. Condeau's population peaked at 1,034 inhabitants in 1821.

Sites

Sites in Condeau include:
 Church of Saint-Denis (Église Saint-Denis):  16th-century church that houses three paintings registered as historic monuments
 Villeray Castle (Château de Villeray ): 18th-century castle registered as an historic monument
 Old Mill on the Huisne (Ancien moulin sur l'Huisne):  Dependency of the castle of Villeray
 Manor Grand Brolles:  16th-century chapel
 Radray Chapel (Chapelle de Radray)

Notable inhabitants

 Jacques-Claude Dugué d'Assé  (1749-1830), French politician
 Robert-Jules Garnier  (1883-1958), French chief designer
 James Rossant (1928-2009), American architect and artist
 Colette Rossant (1932), French-American writer

See also

 Communes of the Orne department
 Le Perche
 Percheron
  Regional Natural Park of Perche

References

Geography of Orne
Former communes of Orne